The 2016 Lale Cup was a professional tennis tournament played on outdoor hard courts. It was the fourth edition of the tournament and part of the 2016 ITF Women's Circuit, offering a total of $50,000 in prize money. It took place in Istanbul, Turkey, on 11–17 April 2016.

Singles main draw entrants

Seeds 

 1 Rankings as of 4 April 2016.

Other entrants 
The following players received wildcards into the singles main draw:
  Başak Akbaş
  İnci Öğüt
  Selin Övünç
  Pemra Özgen

The following players received entry from the qualifying draw:
  Freya Christie
  Lina Gjorcheska
  Viktoria Kamenskaya
  Pia König

Champions

Singles

 Barbora Štefková def.  Anastasia Pivovarova, 7–5, 2–6, 6–1

Doubles

 Nigina Abduraimova /  Barbora Štefková def.  Valentyna Ivakhnenko /  Lidziya Marozava, 6–4, 1–6, [10–6]

External links 
 2016 Lale Cup at ITFtennis.com

2016 ITF Women's Circuit
2016 in Turkish tennis
2016
2016 in Turkish women's sport